Steven Dwayne Harris (October 15, 1963 – February 22, 2016) was an American professional basketball player who was selected by the Houston Rockets in the first round (19th pick overall) of the 1985 NBA draft. A 6'5" shooting guard from the University of Tulsa, Harris played in five NBA seasons from 1985 to 1990. 

He played a career total of 207 NBA games with the Rockets, Golden State Warriors, Detroit Pistons and Los Angeles Clippers, scoring 1,440 points. His best year as a professional came during the 1987–88 season, when he split time with the Rockets and Warriors, appearing in 58 games and averaging 9.2 ppg. 

Harris died of colon cancer on February 22, 2016, at the age of 52.

References

External links
Steve Harris at basketball-reference.com

1963 births
2016 deaths
Albany Patroons players
All-American college men's basketball players
American men's basketball players
Basketball players from Kansas City, Missouri
Columbus Horizon players
Deaths from colorectal cancer
Detroit Pistons players
Golden State Warriors players
Houston Rockets draft picks
Houston Rockets players
Los Angeles Clippers players
Shooting guards
Tulsa Golden Hurricane men's basketball players